Fiwi Dwipan Situmorang (born 14 December 1995, in Medan) is an Indonesian professional footballer who played as a forward for Liga 2 club Sriwijaya. He is also a member of Indonesian Army.

Club career 
On 4 April 2014, he signed with Pro Duta. For 2017 season, he played for PSPS Pekanbaru, and made a debut on 24 July 2017, when PSPS Pekanbaru won 2-1 over 757 Kepri Jaya. In January 2018, Persiraja Banda Aceh signed him along with his teammate in PSPS Pekanbaru, Luis Irsandi.

International career 
At international level, he played for Indonesia U-17 and Indonesia U-19.

References

External links 
 Fiwi Dwipan at Liga Indonesia

Living people
1995 births
Indonesian footballers
Sportspeople from Medan
Association football forwards
PSMS Medan players
PSPS Riau players
PSPS Pekanbaru players
Persiraja Banda Aceh players
Pro Duta FC players